Kotík is a Czech surname.

Jan Kotik (artist) (1916–2002)
Nick Kotik (born 1950), Democratic member of the Pennsylvania House of Representatives
Petr Kotik (born 1942), Czech composer
Kotik (Alexander Rybak song)

See also:
Ignacy Hryniewiecki (1856-1881), Russian revolutionary, known as Kotik

Czech-language surnames